Boss is an unincorporated rural hamlet in eastern Dent County, Missouri, United States. It is located approximately 18 miles east of Salem along Route 32.

The community is named after the nickname of Marion "Boss" Nelson, a lumberman supervisor.  A post office at Boss has been in operation since 1901.  There is also a residential hotel.

Notes

Unincorporated communities in Dent County, Missouri
Unincorporated communities in Missouri